Paul Zachary Myers (born March 9, 1957) is an American biologist who founded and writes the Pharyngula science-blog. He is associate professor of biology at the University of Minnesota Morris (UMM) where he works in the field of developmental biology. He is a critic of intelligent design and the creationist movement and other pseudoscientific concepts.

In 2006 the journal Nature listed Myers's Pharyngula as the top-ranked blog by a scientist based on popularity. Myers received the American Humanist Association's 2009 Humanist of the Year award and the International Humanist Award in 2011. Asteroid 153298 Paulmyers is named in his honor.

Early life
Myers was born March 9, 1957, the eldest of six children in Kent, Washington; his mother is of Swedish and Norwegian descent. Regarding his ancestry, Myers wrote: "I'm only half Scandinavian. The blood has been thinned with that of those domesticated English and Irish and Scots." He was named "Paul Zachary", after his grandfather, but preferred the initials PZ to being called "Little Paul". He has described his family as "probably what would be called the working poor nowadays", and noted that "when I was growing up I was called white trash more than a few times".

He claims to have been a "science geek" from an early age, gaining an interest in zoology and marine biology from studying the insides of fish while on fishing trips with his father.

Growing up, Myers attended an Evangelical Lutheran Church in America (ELCA) church. Prior to his confirmation, Myers says, "I started thinking, you know, I don't believe a word of this." Now an atheist, Myers comments on his blog about science, education, atheism and religion.

Education and activism
Myers graduated from Kent-Meridian High School in 1975 and subsequently attended DePauw University in Indiana on a full scholarship. However, he returned home the next year after his father suffered a heart attack. He then graduated from the University of Washington in 1979 with Bachelor of Science in zoology. Myers drifted away from this field toward evolutionary developmental biology and obtained a PhD in biology from the University of Oregon.

A self-styled "godless liberal" and outspoken atheist, he is a vocal critic of all forms of religion, superstition, supernaturalism, spirituality and pseudoscience. He is quoted as having "nothing but contempt" for intelligent design, arguing that it is "fundamentally dishonest".

He is also an outspoken supporter of sex-positive feminism.  Myers believes women should make their own sexual choices without outside pressure.

In 2009 Myers was named the American Humanist Association's "Humanist of the Year".

In April 2015, Atheist Ireland issued an official announcement, apologizing that they had given Myers public platforms to speak and that now it is "publicly dissociating itself from the hurtful and dehumanising, hateful and violent, unjust and defamatory rhetoric of the atheist blogger PZ Myers... We believe his behaviour is unjust to individuals, increases prejudice against atheists, and is harmful to the promotion of an ethical society based on empathy, fairness, justice and integrity.".

In 2017, Myers, who formerly considered himself one of the "New Atheists", disassociated himself from the New Atheist label. Describing the label as being applied "against our protests, because we were all aware that there was nothing new about it. Maybe we were more aggressive, or maybe suddenly people were listening to us, but really, it was the same old atheism with a fancy artisan label". Myers prefers to be simply referred to as an atheist.

Post-graduate career
Myers has taught and researched at the University of Oregon, the University of Utah and Temple University. He is currently an associate professor of biology at the University of Minnesota's Morris campus. He is a member of Minnesota Citizens for Science Education, and cultivates an interest in cephalopods.

Blogging and writing

Myers has been active on the internet. He was involved in scientific debates on USENET surrounding the growing creationist movement. He was a founding member of The Panda's Thumb blog. In June 2002, he started his website Pharyngula.org, which morphed into a blog now hosted by ScienceBlogs and Freethought Blogs.

Pharyngula

Pharyngula is Myers's personal weblog, promoted as "Evolution, development, and random biological ejaculations from a godless liberal." The topics Myers covers are eclectic, delving into the non-scientific as well as scientific. While Pharyngula includes many articles discussing breaking science news and research, the blog has become particularly well known for ridicule of intelligent design and of attempts to insert it into science education. In 2006, the science journal Nature listed Pharyngula as the top-ranked blog written by a scientist.

Pharyngula.org was started on June 19, 2002. It started out as an experiment in writing instruction for a class. Students were required to submit mini-essays to be published online. After the project was finished, Myers still had the web-publishing software, and started to use it himself. The blog is named after his favorite stage in embryonic development, the pharyngula stage. Pharyngula moved to hosting at ScienceBlogs, a project of Seed Magazine, in 2005.

On Pharyngula, Myers has repeatedly denounced the Discovery Institute, Answers in Genesis, and other creationist websites, as well as offering rebuttals to Intelligent Design, pointing out that its claims are pseudoscientific. Other posts on Pharyngula cover a broad variety of topics that interest Myers. These include cephalopods; science; religion; local, national and international politics, particularly those involving science and/or education; superstition; and evolutionary developmental biology. Myers dismissed the Discovery Institute's petition "A Scientific Dissent From Darwinism", stating that the scientists listed did not have credentials relevant to biology, and that the number of them was minuscule compared to the scientific community as a whole.

On his blog in 2007, Myers reviewed Stuart Pivar's book Lifecode, which argues that self-organization at the embryonic and fetal stages determine the development and final structure of organisms. Myers reviewed the book negatively, stating that the diagrams and ideas in the book arose from Pivar's imagination and had no basis in actual evidence.
How his theory can be reconciled with a large body of embryological evidence that directly contradicts virtually all of it is not clear, and Pivar has chosen not to address any of it. And a book full of geometrically interesting sketches neither explains nor supports Pivar's theory. ... Theories are supposed to explain observation and experiment. You don't come up with a theory first, and then invent the evidence to support it.
After some discussion in the comments threads of Pharyngula, Pivar sued Myers for libel. Within a week Pivar withdrew the lawsuit, stating that "the real issue got sidelined" and that his problem was more with Seed Media Group.

In addition to articles about keeping religion out of science education, church-state separation, and complaints of misdeeds done in the name of religion, Myers continues to write about science in the disciplines of evolution, palaeontology, genetics, development, and molecular biology.

In 2012, Myers announced that Chris Clarke, an environmentalist and blogger, would become Pharyngula's co-author. Clarke left the blog in August 2013, partly because of the perceived unpleasantness of Pharyngula commenters.

Book
Myers's book, The Happy Atheist, was published by Random House in August, 2013. It is largely a compilation of previous blog posts. Voice for its audiobook version was provided by noted atheist and science communicator Aron Ra.

Fellow blogger Greg Laden celebrates "the level of refinement of his writing" and writes that "these essays actually have a different feel to them".

Eucharist incident

A controversy arose in July 2008 over a Pharyngula blog entry written by Myers expressing amazement at news reports of death threats issued to University of Central Florida Student Senator Webster Cook. On June 29, 2008, Cook attended a Catholic Mass being held in the student union at UCF by a Catholic student group that receives funding from the student government. Cook received the Catholic Eucharist host but did not consume it immediately. He said later that he wanted to take it back to his seat to show a friend, but when stopped he pretended to put it in his mouth until back at his seat, then a church leader made forcible attempts to take the wafer from him. Cook stored the host at his home, then returned it one week later after receiving e-mail threats and pleas. Bill Donohue, President of the Catholic League, described the student's actions as "beyond hate speech" and said that "All options should be on the table, including expulsion."

In his July 8 blog entry, Myers criticized the reaction to Cook's act. Myers described the level of harassment including multiple death threats leveled against the student, and accusations against the student which included hate crime, kidnapping, and intent to desecrate the Eucharist which Catholics consider a mortal sin. Myers expressed outrage that Fox News Channel appeared to be inciting readers to cause further problems for the student, and ridiculed reports that armed guards would attend the next mass. Myers suggested that if any of his readers could acquire some consecrated Eucharistic hosts for him, he would treat the wafers "with profound disrespect and heinous cracker abuse, all photographed and presented here on the web."

Myers was criticized from both religious and non-religious quarters. The Catholic League accused Myers of anti-Catholic bigotry, described his proposal as a threat to desecrate what Catholics hold to be the Body of Christ, and sent a letter asking the University of Minnesota and the Minnesota State Legislature to take action against Myers. The Catholic League argued that, as the Pharyngula website was accessible via a link from the University of Minnesota's website, it should be bound by the university's code of conduct, which requires faculty to be "respectful, fair and civil" when dealing with others. Joe Foley, a member of the Board of the Secular Student Alliance, wrote on the organization's website that Myers had "crossed the line" from "playful satire" to "masturbatory condescension". Foley concluded, "if open-minded believers are willing to join us in polite dialogue, we need to be ready to welcome them with more than ridicule and pranks."

Subsequently, Myers explained to the Star Tribune that while his post was "satire and protest," he had received death threats regarding the incident but was not taking them too seriously. In a talk show featuring Myers on Catholic Radio International, hosted by Jeff Gardner, Myers confirmed that he had been sent an unspecified number of consecrated hosts and said that he intended to "subject them to heinous cracker abuse." When asked by Gardner to explain why he must do so, Myers said that Donohue of the Catholic League was insisting that he acknowledge the Body of Christ in the Eucharist. Gardner pointed out that Donohue had no authority to insist on such acknowledgment. The show host then asked Myers which individual possessing the Magisterial authority of the Catholic Church had insisted that he recognize the Body of Christ in the Eucharist. Myers replied that no one from the Catholic Church had contacted him.

On July 24, 2008, Myers, in his post, "The Great Desecration," wrote that he had pierced through the "goddamned cracker" with a rusty nail, which he also used to pierce a few ripped-out pages of the Qur'an (in English translation, not the original Arabic) and The God Delusion, and had simply thrown them all in the trash along with old coffee grounds and a banana peel. He provided a photograph of these items in the garbage, and wrote that nothing must be held sacred, encouraging people to question everything. In addition, he described the history of allegations of host desecration, emphasizing the frequent use of such allegations in medieval Europe to justify anti-Semitism. The following day, University of Minnesota, Morris (UMM) Chancellor stated: "I believe that behaviors that discriminate against or harass individuals or groups on the basis of their religious beliefs are reprehensible" and that the school "affirms the freedom of a faculty member to speak or write as a public citizen without institutional discipline or restraint."

Science activism

Interview and screening of Expelled
In April 2007 Myers was interviewed for what he was told would be a documentary titled Crossroads, purportedly about science and religion. However, in September 2007, executive producer Mark Mathis announced that the film was Expelled: No Intelligence Allowed about perceived censorship of intelligent design supporters in academia and elsewhere. Regarding the discrepancy of focus, Myers wrote: "I mean, seriously, not telling one of the sides in a debate about what the subject might be and then leading him around randomly to various topics, with the intent of later editing it down to the parts that just make the points you want, is the video version of quote-mining and is fundamentally dishonest."

On March 20, 2008, Myers was denied entry into a screening of Expelled: No Intelligence Allowed at the Mall of America in Minneapolis. He was waiting with his family and guests to attend a private screening after having reserved seats for himself and guests under his own name using the freely available online procedure set up by the film's promoters. Shortly before the film started, a security guard told him that the producer Mark Mathis had instructed that Myers be removed from the premises. After telling his family of this Myers went to a nearby Apple store and blogged about his amusement that they had expelled him, but allowed his guest entry to see the film—British evolutionary biologist Richard Dawkins, who had also been interviewed for the film under similar circumstances. In a question and answer session at the end of the film Dawkins asked why Myers had been excluded, and later said that "if anyone had a right to see the film, it was [Myers]. The incompetence, on a public relations level, is beyond belief." The saga has been described by Dawkins as "an incredible piece of inept public relations" on the part of the film's producers.

Creation Museum visit

Myers's engagement as keynote speaker at the 2009 Secular Student Alliance Conference in Columbus, Ohio, developed into an August 7, 2009, trip, in which 304 attendees visited the nearby Creation Museum in Petersburg, Kentucky.

Appearances
Myers has been invited to speak about science, rationalism, or atheism at conferences, symposia, and other events.

 Secular Student Alliance Conference in Columbus, Ohio, 2009
 Glasgow Skeptics in the Pub, 2011
 Global Atheist Convention in Melbourne, Australia, 2012
 Reason Rally, 24 March 2012

In July 2013, Freethought Blogs organized an online virtual conference called FtBCon or FtB Conscience. Google+ Hangout software was used to enable real-time discussion around the world. Participants included all the Freethought Blog bloggers as well as Jeremy Beahan, Jamila Bey, Virginia Brown, Ania Bula, David Brin, Eneasz Brodski, Ian Bushfield, environmental blogger and author Chris Clarke, James Croft, Heina Dadabhoy, J. T. Eberhard, Daniel Fincke, Debbie Goddard, Julia Galef, Nicole Harris, Rebecca Hensler, scientist and blogger Greg Laden, Robin Marty, science artist & blogger Glendon Mellow, Aoife O'Riordan, Beth Presswood of The Atheist Experience, Kim Rippere, Amy Roth, Jacques Rousseau, Desiree Schell of Skeptically Speaking, David Silverman, Xavier Trapp, blogger Rebecca Watson, Eliezer Yudkowsky, scientist & blogger Bora Zivkovic, and others. The conference was free and took place over three days.

Awards
Myers has received several awards for his activism and blogging.
 International Humanist Award (2011)
 Humanist of the Year award (2009) American Humanist Association
 Top-ranked blog written by a scientist (Nature science journal, 2006)

See also 

 Antitheism
 Conflict thesis

References

External links

Official
 Pharyngula – Official blog
Interviews/Presentations
 Minnesota Citizens for Science Education
 Interview with PZ Myers (January 26, 2007) on The Inoculated Mind
 Poll Crashers Tilt Unscientific Polls Their Way
 PZ Myers – Global Atheist Convention 2010

1957 births
20th-century atheists
21st-century atheists
21st-century American biologists
American atheism activists
American bloggers
American feminists
American people of English descent
American people of Irish descent
American people of Norwegian descent
American people of Swedish descent
American secularists
American skeptics
American atheist writers
Catholicism-related controversies
Critics of alternative medicine
Critics of creationism
DePauw University alumni
Evolutionary biologists
Former Lutherans
Freethought
Living people
Male feminists
New Atheism
People from Kent, Washington
People from Stevens County, Minnesota
Science activists
Science bloggers
Sex-positive feminists
Temple University faculty
University of Minnesota Morris
University of Oregon College of Arts and Sciences alumni
University of Oregon faculty
University of Utah faculty
University of Washington College of Arts and Sciences alumni